Just Desserts is a 2004 American made-for-television romantic comedy film reuniting Costas Mandylor and Lauren Holly, who had previously worked together on the television series Picket Fences.  It premiered on Hallmark Channel on February 8, 2004.

Plot 
Passionate Italian baker Marco Poloni (Costas Mandylor) enters a baking competition entitled "The Golden Whisk" to attract publicity and win prize money to support his struggling family-owned bakery in the Bronx. He asks for the help of uptight Manhattan-based pastry-maker Grace Carpenter (Lauren Holly). The unlikely pair must win to pursue their dreams and to show up an old rival of Poloni's who has also entered the competition. Along the way Marco and Grace seem to find a mutual attraction for each other.

Cast 
 Costas Mandylor as Marco Poloni
 Lauren Holly as Grace Carpenter
Dorie Barton as Candy Fallon
 Andrew Lauer as Jacques du Jacques
 Brenda Vaccaro as Lina
 Wolfgang Puck as Himself

External links 
 
 
 Just Desserts on HallmarkChannel.tv

2004 television films
2004 films
2004 romantic comedy films
American romantic comedy films
Films directed by Kevin Connor
Hallmark Channel original films
Cooking films
2000s American films
2000s English-language films
American comedy television films
Romance television films